The 93rd 2019 Lunar New Year Cup (Chinese: 豬年賀歲盃; literally: "Year of the Pig Celebrate New Year Cup"), was the annual edition of the Lunar New Year Cup, held in Hong Kong to celebrate the Lunar New Year in early January 2019. This year, four teams were invited to participate, playing two games each in a knockout tournament.

Format
The two semi-finals for the four participating teams were held on the first day of the Lunar New Year of Pig (5 February 2019). The winning teams entered the final and the losing teams play the third-place playoff (Both matches on the third day of the Lunar New Year, i.e. 7 February.) Draw in the semi-finals and third-place playoff were settled by penalty shootout directly, that means no extra time would be played. For the final, a thirty-minute extra time would be played after a draw. A further draw would lead to the penalty shootout.

Teams
Four teams were invited to participate: 
  HK LNY Selection Team (as known as Hong Kong League XI ) (hosts)
  Sagan Tosu
  Auckland City
  Shandong Luneng

Squads

HK LNY Selection Team
Manager:  Kevin Bond：

Sagan Tosu
Manager:  Lluís Carreras

Auckland City
Manager:  Ramon Tribulietx

Shandong Luneng Taishan F.C.
Manager:  Li Xiaopeng

Fixtures and results
All times are local, HKT (UTC+8).

Semi-finals

Third place play-off

Final

See also
Hong Kong Football Association
Hong Kong Premier League

References

2019
2018–19 in Hong Kong football
February 2019 sports events in China